"Psychopomp" is a song by Canadian rock band The Tea Party. It was released as a promotional single in Canada. The music video was shot live in the MuchMusic CHUM-City Building in Toronto, before and during their Intimate & Interactive performance in May 1998.

"Psychopomp" is a reworking of a composition called "Something More" that Jeff Burrows and Jeff Martin wrote as teenagers.

Track listing 
"Psychopomp (Tom Lord Alge mix)"

References 

1998 singles
The Tea Party songs